Samuel Aziz (born 5 July 1991) is a Swedish footballer of Ethiopian descent who plays as a forward, most recently for Eskilsminne IF.

Club career
Samuel began his senior playing career, playing for Helsingborgs IF in the Swedish league Allsvenskan, the top tier of Swedish football.
In 2014, he did 25 goals in 25 games, and became the top scorer in league 2 for Hoganas BK. In 2015, he signed for Landskrona BoIS. He made his competition debut playing 90 minutes against the Swedish top team AIK in February.

Before signing for Helsingborgs IF, Samuel had trials for Premier League side Arsenal, Eredivisie side Feyenoord, and Serie A side Juventus.
In 2012, he had trials at clubs in England and undertook a 3-week trial at Premier League club Stoke City in July. A month later he spent three weeks at Championship club Crystal Palace and was in talks over a short term contract.

References

External links

1991 births
Living people
Swedish people of Ethiopian descent
Swedish sportspeople of African descent
Sportspeople of Ethiopian descent
Association football forwards
Helsingborgs IF players
Ängelholms FF players
Varbergs BoIS players
Högaborgs BK players
IF Limhamn Bunkeflo (men) players
Landskrona BoIS players
Syrianska FC players
Huddinge IF players
GIF Sundsvall players
IK Brage players
Allsvenskan players
Superettan players
Division 2 (Swedish football) players
Sweden youth international footballers
Swedish footballers
Sportspeople from Helsingborg